Piedmont Avenue is a street in the city of Berkeley, California. Originally known as Piedmont Way, is the major street through the University of California, Berkeley's fraternity and sorority area. The street was originally named Piedmont Way.

Piedmont Way was conceived in 1865 by Frederick Law Olmsted, America's foremost landscape architect. As the centerpiece of a gracious residential community close beside the College of California, Olmsted envisioned a roadway that would follow the natural contours of the land and be sheltered from sun and wind by "an overarching bowery of foliage." This curvilinear, tree-lined parkway was Olmsted's first residential street design. It has served as the model for similar parkways across the US. This original portion, now located between Gayley Road and Dwight Way, is designated as Berkeley Heritage and California Historical Landmark.

References

External links

Berkeley Architectural Heritage Association

Streets in Berkeley, California
California Historical Landmarks
Historic American Landscapes Survey in California